Timothy Frances Cloughesy is a professor of Clinical Neurology and director of the Neuro-Oncology Program at the University of California, Los Angeles. He is an expert on the treatment of brain cancer.

He completed his MD at Tulane University School of Medicine in 1987 and BA degree with Honors in Chemistry in 1983 at University of California, Santa Barbara.  He has an h-index of 119.

References 

American oncologists
Cancer researchers
Living people
Tulane University School of Medicine alumni
David Geffen School of Medicine at UCLA faculty
Year of birth missing (living people)
American neurologists
University of California, Santa Barbara alumni